Clivio Piccione (born February 24, 1984 in Monte Carlo, Monaco) is a Monégasque race car driver. He raced in the 2005 GP2 Series season for the Durango team and David Price Racing for 2006.

Career
Piccione's career started in karting in 1997, where he stayed until 2001 before moving up to British Formula Ford. He only spent one season there, debuting in British Formula 3's B-Class in 2002 for the T-Sport team. 2003 saw him move up to the main class with the Manor team, where he won the a race at Knockhill. For 2004, he joined Carlin Motorsport and won two races at Donington Park.

In 2005 the Monegasque driver drove in the inaugural GP2 Series season, driving for the Durango team, winning the sprint race at the Nürburgring round. However, results were not in his favour for the remainder of the season and for 2006 he would switch to DPR Direxiv. He would score two podiums for the team at Silverstone and Monza. After leaving GP2, he competed in the World Series by Renault for 2007. In 2008 he raced in F3000 Euroseries, Italian F3000 and EuroBOSS.

Piccione drove in the 2008-09 A1 Grand Prix season for the newly formed A1 Team Monaco.  He was the nation's joint seat-holder, alongside Hubertus Bahlsen. He competed in all races in the 2008-09 season, scoring pole for the South African feature race and finishing a best of third place in the same race. Team Monaco finished 9th overall with 35 points, however the series collapsed a year later and could not improve on this result. Piccione represented Monaco at the 2009 Race of Champions.

Following the loss of his A1 Grand Prix seat, Piccione joined Hexis AMR in the FIA GT1 Championship.  He competed for the team across 2010 and 2011, driving their Aston Martin DBR9. The best result was victory in 2011 at the Yas Marina Circuit.

Following his racing career, Piccione designed the Kart Indoor Monaco in Fontvieille. In 2018, he drove a McLaren M14A in the Monaco Historic Grand Prix. In 2022, he was behind the formation of the Monaco E-Kart Championship, with backing from Monegasque Formula 1 driver Charles Leclerc.

Racing record

Complete GP2 Series results
(key) (Races in bold indicate pole position) (Races in italics indicate fastest lap)

Complete Formula Renault 3.5 Series results
(key) (Races in bold indicate pole position) (Races in italics indicate fastest lap)

† Driver did not finish the race, but was classified as he completed more than 90% of the race distance.

Complete A1 Grand Prix results
(key) (Races in bold indicate pole position) (Races in italics indicate fastest lap)

Complete GT1 World Championship results

References

External links
Official website
driverdb.com profile

1984 births
Living people
People from Monte Carlo
Monegasque racing drivers
Formula Ford drivers
British Formula Three Championship drivers
Auto GP drivers
A1 Team Monaco drivers
A1 Grand Prix team owners
GP2 Series drivers
World Series Formula V8 3.5 drivers
FIA GT1 World Championship drivers
Porsche Supercup drivers
Carlin racing drivers
Manor Motorsport drivers
A1 Grand Prix drivers
T-Sport drivers
RC Motorsport drivers
Durango drivers
David Price Racing drivers